Saar is a series of Indian Kannada-language comedy film series. The series is directed by Rajendra Singh Babu. The film's title is based on a famous poem on herd mentality written by acclaimed poet K. S. Nissar Ahmed.

Films

Kurigalu Saar Kurigalu

Rummi, Nani and Moni are inmates who wants to remain in jail permanently. A kind hearted jailor gets them released on basis of good behavior and wants them to lead a good life.
An auto driver allowed them to house without any rent but with one condition. One of them should his middle aged unmarried elder sister Rukmini who is devotee of Lord Krishna. On the night Rukmini assumes Nani is tha avatar of Krishna and forced him to marriage and threatened. Trio escapes from marriage by wearing "Trimoorty" dress, while escaping enter bank unknowingly and got bags of money intended for other robbers. They saw and save the Jailor daughter from committing suicide and decide to help her. Undercover police inspector joined them to find truth about bank robbers.

Kothigalu Saar Kothigalu

Katthegalu Saar Katthegalu

Chatrigalu Saar Chatrigalu

Principal cast
This table lists the main characters who appear in the Saar franchise.
A dark grey cell indicates the character was not in the film.

Crew

Awards

References

External links
 
 
 
 

Indian film series
Comedy film series